Mytilaster lineatus is a species of marine mussel, distributed in European waters. It is common in Greece, Russia and Ukraine (Mediterranean and Black Seas). It is referred as an introduced species in the Caspian Sea.

References

External links 
 Mytilaster lineatus in Sealife Base
 БИОЦЕНОЗ MYTILASTER LINEATUS В СРЕДНЕМ КАСПИИ

lineatus
Molluscs of the Mediterranean Sea
Molluscs of the Black Sea
Molluscs of Europe
Invertebrates of Turkey
Marine molluscs of Asia
Bivalves of Asia
Marine molluscs of Africa
Marine molluscs of Europe
Bivalves described in 1791